This is a list of the bird species recorded in the Pitcairn Islands. The avifauna of the Pitcairn Islands include a total of 62 species, of which five are endemic.

This list's taxonomic treatment (designation and sequence of orders, families and species) and nomenclature (common and scientific names) follow the conventions of The Clements Checklist of Birds of the World, 2022 edition. The family accounts at the beginning of each heading reflect this taxonomy, as do the species counts found in each family account.

The following tags have been used to highlight several categories. Not all species fall into one of these categories. Those that do not are commonly occurring native species.

(A) Accidental - a species that rarely or accidentally occurs in the Pitcairn Islands
(I) Introduced - a species introduced to the Pitcairn Islands as a consequence, direct or indirect, of human actions
(E) Endemic - a species endemic to the Pitcairn Islands
(Ex) Extinct - a species formerly endemic to the Pitcairn Islands, now extinct

Pheasants, grouse, and allies 
Order: GalliformesFamily: Phasianidae

The Phasianidae are a family of terrestrial birds which consists of quails, partridges, snowcocks, francolins, spurfowls, tragopans, monals, pheasants, peafowls, grouse, ptarmigan, and junglefowls. In general, they are plump (although they vary in size) and have broad, relatively short wings.

Red junglefowl, Gallus gallus (I)

Pigeons and doves
Order: ColumbiformesFamily: Columbidae

Pigeons and doves are stout-bodied birds with short necks and short slender bills with a fleshy cere.

Henderson fruit-dove, Ptilinopus insularis (E)
Henderson imperial-pigeon, Ducula harrisoni (Ex)
Henderson ground dove, Pampusana leonpascoi (Ex)
Henderson archaic pigeon, Bountyphaps obsoleta (Ex)

Cuckoos
Order: CuculiformesFamily: Cuculidae

The family Cuculidae includes cuckoos, roadrunners and anis. These birds are of variable size with slender bodies, long tails and strong legs. The Old World cuckoos are brood parasites.

Long-tailed koel, Eudynamys taitensis

Rails, gallinules, and coots
Order: GruiformesFamily: Rallidae

Rallidae is a large family of small to medium-sized birds which includes the rails, crakes, coots and gallinules. Typically they inhabit dense vegetation in damp environments near lakes, swamps or rivers. In general they are shy and secretive birds, making them difficult to observe. Most species have strong legs and long toes which are well adapted to soft uneven surfaces. They tend to have short, rounded wings and to be weak fliers.

Henderson Island crake, Zapornia atra (E)
Spotless crake, 	Zapornia tabuensis

Plovers and lapwings
Order: CharadriiformesFamily: Charadriidae

The family Charadriidae includes the plovers, dotterels and lapwings. They are small to medium-sized birds with compact bodies, short, thick necks and long, usually pointed, wings. They are found in open country worldwide, mostly in habitats near water.

Black-bellied plover, Pluvialis squatarola (A)
Pacific golden-plover, Pluvialis fulva

Sandpipers and allies
Order: CharadriiformesFamily: Scolopacidae

Scolopacidae is a large diverse family of small to medium-sized shorebirds including the sandpipers, curlews, godwits, shanks, tattlers, woodcocks, snipes, dowitchers and phalaropes. The majority of these species eat small invertebrates picked out of the mud or soil. Variation in length of legs and bills enables multiple species to feed in the same habitat, particularly on the coast, without direct competition for food.

Bristle-thighed curlew, Numenius tahitiensis
Ruddy turnstone, Arenaria interpres
Sanderling, Calidris alba
Wandering tattler, Tringa incana

Gulls, terns, and skimmers
Order: CharadriiformesFamily: Laridae

Laridae is a family of medium to large seabirds, the gulls, terns, and skimmers. Gulls are typically grey or white, often with black markings on the head or wings. They have stout, longish bills and webbed feet. Terns are a group of generally medium to large seabirds typically with grey or white plumage, often with black markings on the head. Most terns hunt fish by diving but some pick insects off the surface of fresh water. Terns are generally long-lived birds, with several species known to live in excess of 30 years.

Laughing gull, Leucophaeus atricilla
Brown noddy, Anous stolidus
Black noddy, Anous minutus
Gray noddy, Anous albivitta
Blue-gray noddy, Anous ceruleus
White tern, Gygis alba
Sooty tern, Onychoprion fuscatus
Gray-backed tern, Onychoprion lunatus
Great crested tern, Thalasseus bergii (A)

Tropicbirds
Order: PhaethontiformesFamily: Phaethontidae

Tropicbirds are slender white birds of tropical oceans, with exceptionally long central tail feathers. Their heads and long wings have black markings.

White-tailed tropicbird, Phaethon lepturus
Red-tailed tropicbird, Phaethon rubricauda

Albatrosses
Order: ProcellariiformesFamily: Diomedeidae

The albatrosses are among the largest of flying birds, and the great albatrosses from the genus Diomedea have the largest wingspans of any extant birds.

Buller's albatross, Thalassarche bulleri
Black-browed albatross, Thalassarche melanophris (A)
Wandering albatross, Diomedea exulans (A)

Southern storm-petrels
Order: ProcellariiformesFamily: Oceanitidae

The southern storm-petrels are relatives of the petrels and are the smallest seabirds. They feed on planktonic crustaceans and small fish picked from the surface, typically while hovering. The flight is fluttering and sometimes bat-like.

Wilson's storm-petrel, Oceanites oceanicus
White-faced storm-petrel, Pelagodroma marina
White-bellied storm-petrel, Fregetta grallaria
Black-bellied storm-petrel, Fregetta tropica
Polynesian storm-petrel, Nesofregetta fuliginosa

Shearwaters and petrels
Order: ProcellariiformesFamily: Procellariidae

The procellariids are the main group of medium-sized "true petrels", characterised by united nostrils with medium septum and a long outer functional primary.

Southern giant-petrel, Macronectes giganteus
Cape petrel, Daption capense
Gray-faced petrel, Pterodroma gouldi
Kermadec petrel, Pterodroma neglecta
Herald petrel, Pterodroma heraldica
Murphy's petrel, Pterodroma ultima
Henderson petrel, Pterodroma atrata
Soft-plumaged petrel, Pterodroma mollis
White-headed petrel, Pterodroma lessonii
Black-winged petrel, Pterodroma nigripennis
Cook's petrel, Pterodroma cookii
Gould's petrel, Pterodroma leucoptera
Phoenix petrel, Pterodroma alba
Bulwer's petrel, Bulweria bulwerii
Tahiti petrel, Pseudobulweria rostrata
White-chinned petrel, Procellaria aequinoctialis
Parkinson's petrel, Procellaria parkinsoni
Wedge-tailed shearwater, Ardenna pacificus
Buller's shearwater, Ardenna bulleri
Christmas shearwater, Puffinus nativitatis
Tropical shearwater, Puffinus bailloni

Frigatebirds
Order: SuliformesFamily: Fregatidae

Frigatebirds are large seabirds usually found over tropical oceans. They are large, black and white or completely black, with long wings and deeply forked tails. The males have coloured inflatable throat pouches. They do not swim or walk and cannot take off from a flat surface. Having the largest wingspan-to-body-weight ratio of any bird, they are essentially aerial, able to stay aloft for more than a week.

Lesser frigatebird, Fregata ariel
Great frigatebird, Fregata minor

Boobies and gannets
Order: SuliformesFamily: Sulidae

The sulids comprise the gannets and boobies. Both groups are medium to large coastal seabirds that plunge-dive for fish.

Masked booby, Sula dactylatra
Brown booby, Sula leucogaster
Red-footed booby, Sula sula

Herons, egrets, and bitterns
Order: PelecaniformesFamily: Ardeidae

The family Ardeidae contains the bitterns, herons, and egrets. Herons and egrets are medium to large wading birds with long necks and legs. Bitterns tend to be shorter necked and more wary. Members of Ardeidae fly with their necks retracted, unlike other long-necked birds such as storks, ibises and spoonbills.

Pacific reef-heron, Egretta sacra

Falcons and caracaras
Order: FalconiformesFamily: Falconidae

Falconidae is a family of diurnal birds of prey. They differ from hawks, eagles and kites in that they kill with their beaks instead of their talons.

Peregrine falcon, Falco peregrinus

Old World parrots
Order: PsittaciformesFamily: Psittaculidae

Characteristic features of parrots include a strong curved bill, an upright stance, strong legs, and clawed zygodactyl feet. Many parrots are vividly colored, and some are multi-colored. Old World parrots are found from Africa east across south and southeast Asia and Oceania to Australia and New Zealand.

Stephen's lorikeet, Vini stepheni (E)

Reed warblers and allies
Order: PasseriformesFamily: Acrocephalidae

The members of this family are usually rather large for "warblers". Most are rather plain olivaceous brown above with much yellow to beige below. They are usually found in open woodland, reedbeds, or tall grass. The family occurs mostly in southern to western Eurasia and surroundings, but it also ranges far into the Pacific, with some species in Africa.

Pitcairn reed warbler, Acrocephalus vaughani (E)
Henderson Island reed warbler, Acrocephalus taiti (E)

See also
List of birds
Lists of birds by region

References

Pitcairn Islands
birds
'

'